Rileyiana is a genus of moths of the family Noctuidae.

Species
 Rileyiana fovea (Treitschke, 1825)

References
Natural History Museum Lepidoptera genus database
Rileyiana at funet

Cuculliinae